Bad Fever is a 2011 American independent drama film directed by Dustin Guy Defa.

Synopsis
A relationship occurs between a wishful stand-up comedian (Kentucker Audley) and a shady drifter (Eleonore Hendricks).

Cast

Reception
On the review aggregator Rotten Tomatoes, the film holds an approval rating of 50%, based on 6 reviews, with an average rating of 3.4/10. Metacritic assigned the film a weighted average score of 43 out of 100, based on 4 critics, indicating "mixed or average reviews".

Richard Brody of The New Yorker praised the direction, saying: "Defa exerts delicate control over his incendiary material and evokes emotional terrors with a sympathetic directness; his raw-toned drama is quietly hectic and brutally poignant."

References

External links
 

2011 films
2010s English-language films
2011 drama films